John Cuthbert (December 16, 1894 – May 10, 1960) was a Scottish-born Canadian long-distance runner. He competed in the marathon at the 1924 Summer Olympics, finishing thirteenth. Cuthbert competed in the 1930 British Empire Games marathon, but did not finish.

References

External links
 

1894 births
1960 deaths
Athletes (track and field) at the 1924 Summer Olympics
Canadian male long-distance runners
Canadian male marathon runners
Olympic track and field athletes of Canada
Athletes (track and field) at the 1930 British Empire Games
Commonwealth Games competitors for Canada
Sportspeople from Glasgow
Scottish emigrants to Canada